Albert E. Foote (1846–1895) was an American mineralogist and physician.

Early life 
On February 4, 1846, Foote was born in Hamilton, New York. Foote's father was Edward Warren Foote. Foote's mother was Phoebe Steere.

Education 
Foote attended Academy at Cortland, New York he changed to Madison University and later to Harvard University. He was admitted to University of Michigan where he studied medicine. He received his Doctorate 25 June 1867.

Career 
With Foote's knowledge of chemistry, he was appointed assistant professor at the Iowa State Agricultural College at Ames in 1861. He became a full professor in 1871. 

He was a collector of minerals all his life and acquired a collection which was presented on several occasions. At the Centennial Exposition in 1876 in Philadelphia he started selling part of his collected mineral starting a business as a professional mineral trader.

Personal life 
In December 1872, Foote's son Warren Mathews Foote was born in Ames, Iowa.

On October 10, 1895, Foote died of chronic tuberculosis.
 
His company was taken over by his son.

References

Additional sources 

1846 births
1895 deaths
American mineralogists
University of Michigan Medical School alumni